Micragrella ochrea is a moth of the subfamily Arctiinae. It was described by George Hampson in 1901. It is found in Brazil.

References

 

Arctiinae
Moths described in 1901